Nogometni klub Radomlje or simply NK Radomlje, currently named Kalcer Radomlje for sponsorship reasons, is a Slovenian football club located in the town of Radomlje. They play in the Slovenian PrvaLiga, the top tier of Slovenian football.

History
Although the settlement of Radomlje had an informal football club formed in 1934 as part of the town's sports club, the club was legally not established until 1972 by a group of local workers. The club competed in the lower regional and amateur leagues in Yugoslavia until the independence of Slovenia in 1991. In the 2014–15 season, Radomlje played in the top tier of Slovenian football, the Slovenian PrvaLiga, for the first time in their history.

Supporters
Radomlje supporters are called Mlinarji. The group was formed in April 2009.

Current squad

Honours
Slovenian Second League
 Winners: 2015–16, 2020–21

Slovenian Third League
 Winners: 2010–11

Slovenian Fourth Division
 Winners: 2002–03

MNZ Ljubljana Cup
 Winners: 2013–14, 2018–19

League history since 1991

See also
ŽNK Radomlje, women's team

References

External links
Official website 
PrvaLiga profile 
Soccerway profile

Association football clubs established in 1972
Football clubs in Slovenia
Football clubs in Yugoslavia
1972 establishments in Slovenia